The 1988–89 Siena Saints men's basketball team represented Siena College in the 1988–89 college basketball season. This was head coach Mike Deane's third season at Siena. The Saints competed in the North Atlantic Conference and played their home games at Alumni Recreation Center. They finished the season 25–5, 16–1 in NAC play to capture the regular season championship. They also won the 1989 North Atlantic Conference men's basketball tournament to earn the conference's automatic bid to the 1989 NCAA Division I men's basketball tournament. They earned a 14 seed in the East Region where they defeated 3 seed and AP #13 Stanford in the first round, before losing to Minnesota.

Schedule and results
Source
All times are Eastern

|-
!colspan=9| Regular Season

|-
!colspan=10| 1989 North Atlantic Conference men's basketball tournament

|-
!colspan=10| 1989 NCAA Division I men's basketball tournament

References

Siena
Siena Saints men's basketball seasons
Siena
Siena Saints men's basketball
Siena Saints men's basketball